Checokalako was a Sauk chief aligned with Black Hawk's British Band during the 1832 Black Hawk War.

British Band
Checokalako was a Sauk and one of seven civil chiefs aligned with Black Hawk's British Band during the Black Hawk War in 1832.

References

Native American leaders
Native Americans of the Black Hawk War
Year of birth missing
Year of death missing